Wedding dress of Princess Mary may refer to:
 Wedding dress of Princess Mary of Teck
 Wedding dress of Princess Mary of the United Kingdom